Francisco Álvares de Assis Airport , popularly called Serrinha Airport, is an airport in Juiz de Fora, Brazil.

It is managed by contract by Infraero.

History
The airport was commissioned in 1958.

The aviation club of Juiz de Fora is based at the airport.

On 2 April 2014 the airport ceased to receive regular commercial flights. These flights were transferred to the new and larger Pres.

Airlines and destinations
No scheduled flights operate at this airport.

Access

See also

List of airports in Brazil

References

External links

Airports in Minas Gerais
Airports established in 1958
Juiz de Fora